K. S. Chithra was introduced to Hindi film music in 1985; she recorded her first Hindi song composed by S. P. Venkitesh, which was not commercially released. For the 1991 Hindi film Love, composers Anand–Milind, called upon her to sing duets song along with S. P. Balasubrahmanyam and since then, Chithra has recorded for around 200 Bollywood songs. Then she went on recording some Hindi songs under A. R. Rahman's compositions from 1991 to 1995, her breakthrough in Hindi film music came through "Kehna Hi Kya" from the film Bombay (1995), which was highly successful in the North Indian region and gave her an identity in Bollywood film industry ("Kehna Hi Kya" was included in The Guardian newspaper's "The 1000 songs that everyone must hear"). For the song "Payalein Chunmun" recorded in the 1997 film Virasat, Chithra received the National Film Award for Best Female Playback Singer and became the only South India based female singer till date to achieve the feat. Her most number of Hindi songs were recorded for Anu Malik, the most notable being her voice recorded for eight songs out of eleven in the soundtrack of Main Prem Ki Diwani Hoon in 2003.

Some of Chithra's memorable Hindi songs include "Ye Haseen Wadiyan" from Roja, "Yaaron Sun Lo" from Rangeela, "Hum Tumse Na" from Ziddi, "Payale Chunmun" from Virasat (she won a National Award, Star Screen Award and the nomination for FilmfareAwards for her rendition), "Raat Ka Nasha" from Aśoka, "Pyaar Tune Kya Kiya (sad version)", "Rang De Basanti" title track, "Mere Dil Ka Tumse Hi Kehna" from Armaan , "Mere Dil Ka Tumse Hi Kehna" from the film Armaan In the composition of Rajesh Roshan, she has sung "Koi Mil Gaya" title song of the film Koi... Mil Gaya for which she won Bollywood Movie Awards, MTV Immies Award and the nomination for Filmfare Awards. "Tum Bin Jiya Jaye Kaise" from the film Tum Bin topped the charts and she was lauded for her expressive rendition.

Apart from film songs, Chithra recorded for many private albums of which Piya Basanti and Sunset Point  became hugely popular and went on to win several laurels including the MTV Music Video Awards. The popularity of the former album made her known among the Northern part of Indians identify her as "Piya Basanti" Chitra.

Film songs 
This is an incomplete list

Non-film songs

See also

References

External links
K.S.Chithra on Hungama Digital Media Entertainment

Hindi
Chithra, K. S.